Christoph Wolf (born March 26, 1961) is a West German sprint canoer who competed in the mid-1980s. He was eliminated in the semifinals of the K-1 1000 m event at the 1984 Summer Olympics in Los Angeles.

References
Sports-Reference.com profile

1961 births
Canoeists at the 1984 Summer Olympics
German male canoeists
Living people
Olympic canoeists of West Germany
Place of birth missing (living people)